Teyzem is a 1986 Turkish drama film, directed by Halit Refiğ and starring Müjde Ar, Yasar Alptekin, and Mehmet Akan.

References

External links
Teyzem at the Internet Movie Database

1986 films
Turkish drama films
1986 drama films
Films directed by Halit Refiğ
1980s Turkish-language films